Kenneth Kershaw Booth (22 November 1934 – 7 November 2015) was an English footballer who played as an inside forward. He played over 100 matches in the Football League for several clubs.

Career
Booth started his senior career with his hometown club Blackpool and scored in his single League appearance for the side. In 1957 he joined Bradford Park Avenue and went on to play 45 games for the team, scoring fourteen times. Spells at Workington and Southport followed over the next two seasons before Booth moved into non-League football with Wigan Athletic in 1961, where he scored 7 goals in 12 Cheshire League games.

References

Gerry Wolstenholme's obituary for Ken Booth, 1 March 2016

External links

1934 births
2015 deaths
English footballers
Association football forwards
Blackpool F.C. players
Bradford (Park Avenue) A.F.C. players
Workington A.F.C. players
Southport F.C. players
Wigan Athletic F.C. players
English Football League players